The Rural Municipality of Lakeside No. 338 is a rural municipality (RM) in the Canadian province of Saskatchewan within Census Division No. 10 and  Division No. 4. It is located in the east-central portion of the province.

History 
The RM of Lakeside No. 338 incorporated as a rural municipality on December 12, 1910.

Geography

Communities and localities 
The following urban municipalities are surrounded by the RM.

Towns
 Watson

Villages
 Quill Lake

The following unincorporated communities are within the RM.

Localities
 Lampard
 Wimmer

Demographics 

Economy 
Its economy is predominantly agricultural.

Government 
The RM of Lakeside No. 338 is governed by an elected municipal council and an appointed administrator that meets on the second Thursday of every month. The reeve of the RM is Arnold Boyko while its administrator is Julie Knafelc. The RM's office is located in Quill Lake.

References 

Lakeside
Division No. 10, Saskatchewan